Aag Ka Dariya is a 1953 Indian Hindi-language black-and-white film directed by Roop K. Shorey and starring Karan Dewan, Prithviraj Kapoor, Meena Shorey, Shammi, Uma Dutt, Johnny Walker, Manju and Cecil. Playback singer for this movie was Talat Mahmood. Produced by Shorey Films, it had music by music composer Vinod.

Aag ka Dariya is a melodramatic love story, where the lovers separate due to the machinations of a villain. They keep crossing each other's paths, eventually meeting when the final drama plays out.

Cast
Prithviraj Kapoor	
Karan Dewan
Meena Shorey	
Johnny Walker		
Uma Dutt		
Manju		
Cecil		
Shammi

Soundtrack
Music was composed by Vinod, with lyrics by Aziz Kashmiri. One song, "Ek Dil Hazaar Gham", sung by Talat Mehmood, had lyrics written by Hasrat Jaipuri. The playback singers were Asha Bhosle, Mohammed Rafi, Talat Mahmood, Sulochana Kadam, Lakshmi Roy, Khan Mastana.

Song list

References

External links 
 

1953 films
1950s Hindi-language films
Indian black-and-white films
Films scored by Vinod
Indian drama films
1953 drama films